"Sail Away" is a song by British band Urban Cookie Collective, released in February 1994 as the third single from their debut album, High on a Happy Vibe (1994). Written by producer Rohan Heath, the vocals were by Diane Charlemagne. It was a top 10 hit in Finland (number three) and Switzerland and a top 20 hit the UK. On the Eurochart Hot 100, it reached number 28. Outside Europe, the song was a top 20 hit in Israel and a top 50 hit in Australia. The accompanying music video was directed by British director Lindy Heymann. It was A-listed on Germany's VIVA in March 1994.

Critical reception
Tony Cross from Smash Hits gave the song four out of five, writing, "Obviously totally together, the Collective have left the key under the mat, got more funky for their latest chart assault — and hit the spot again. The combined skills of Judge Jules and Michael Skins have produced a wickedly slick mix of pure dance perfection. And Diane Charlemaine's vocals must be some of the best around. Another top 10 hit should be plain sailing."

Track listing
 7-inch single, UK (1994)
A. "Sail Away" (Maximum Development 7-inch) – 3:22
B. "Sail Away" (The Cookied Edit) – 3:38

 12-inch, UK (1994)
A1. "Sail Away" (Maximum Development Mix) – 6:21
A2. "Sail Away" (Overworld Dub Mix) – 6:36
B1. "Sail Away" (Judge Jules & Michael Skins Pop Funk Mix) – 6:35
B2. "Sail Away" (Judge Jules & Michael Skins Sexy Dub) – 6:35

 CD single, UK (1994)
"Sail Away" (Maximum Development 7-inch) – 3:25
"Sail Away" (The Cookied Edit) – 3:40
"Sail Away" (Maximum Development Mix) – 6:23
"Sail Away" (Overworld Dub Mix) – 6:38
"Sail Away" (Judge Jules & Michael Skins Pop Funk Mix) – 6:41
"Sail Away" (Judge Jules & Michael Skins Sexy Dub) – 6:43
"Sail Away" (The Cookied Mix) – 5:42

 Cassette single, UK (1994)
"Sail Away" (Maximum Development 7-inch) – 3:22
"Sail Away" (The Cookied Edit) – 3:38

Charts

Weekly charts

Year-end charts

References

1994 singles
1994 songs
Music videos directed by Lindy Heymann
Pulse 8 singles
Urban Cookie Collective songs